The final in Royal League 2005-06 season was between F.C. Copenhagen and Lillestrøm S.K..

The match was played on April 6, 2006 at Parken Stadium, Copenhagen.

Match facts

See also
Royal League 2005-06

Royal League Finals
Royal League Final 2006
Final
Royal League Final 2006
Royal League
Royal League
April 2006 sports events in Europe